Edward Richard Russell, 1st Baron Russell of Liverpool (9 August 1834 – 20 February 1920), was a British journalist and Liberal politician.

Russell was a newspaper man who also involved himself in politics. Born in London, he was largely self-made, rising to become Editor of the Liverpool Daily Post, a position he held for almost fifty years. He is reputed to have been a man of great ability, with high religious and moral standards. Well-travelled, an advocate of Temperance, and regarded as able public speaker, he supported the Liberal Party and was a founder of the Liverpool Parliamentary Debating Society. He corresponded with leading figures of the day, for example Annie Besant and H. H. Asquith. In 1865 he left Liverpool for London where he worked for the Morning Star and other newspapers. In writing parliamentary reports, he came to know members of government and was a friend of William Ewart Gladstone.

When Russell returned to Liverpool in 1869, it was as editor of the Daily Post, which, under his leadership, became known as a leading provincial newspaper. From 1885 to 1887 Russell was Liberal MP for the constituency of Glasgow Bridgeton, then in 1893 he was knighted. In 1919, the year before his death, he was raised to the peerage as Baron Russell of Liverpool, of Liverpool in the County Palatine of Lancaster.

Works
 Irving as Hamlet (1875)
 True Macbeth: A Lecture (1875)
 Ibsen: A Lecture Delivered at University College, Liverpool (1894)
 Garrick: A Lecture (1895)
 That Reminds Me (1899)
 Arrested Fugitives (1912)

Arms

Notes

References
Kidd, Charles, Williamson, David (editors). Debrett's Peerage and Baronetage (1990 edition). New York: St Martin's Press, 1990,

External links 
 

1834 births
1920 deaths
Barons in the Peerage of the United Kingdom
Knights Bachelor
Members of the Parliament of the United Kingdom for Glasgow constituencies
UK MPs 1885–1886
UK MPs 1886–1892
UK MPs who were granted peerages
Scottish Liberal Party MPs
Barons created by George V